The 2022 IPSC Handgun World Shoot XIX was held in Thailand from November 27 to December 3. The match consisted of 30 stages over 5 areas, and the main-match sponsor was CZ firearms. The match had a capacity of 1600 competitors, and 1345 competitors from 73 countries completed. It was the first World Shoot featuring the popular Production Optics divisions, and was the nineteenth IPSC Handgun World Shoot.

History 
The championship was originally scheduled for 2020. Due to the COVID-19 pandemic, the match was initially postponed to November/December 2021, but due to the unpredictableness of the COVID situation, the match was finally postponed once more until 2022, coinciding with the completion of the kingdom's full reopening.

Venue and climate 
The match venue was at newly constructed the THPSA Shooting Range. The city of Pattaya is the resort capital of Thailand, and the shooting range is located about 30 km from the Pattaya Beach, which is one of Asia's largest beach resorts. The match was set to the end of November and start of December, which is the start of the cool season in Thailand which is relatively hot and dry, with expected daily mean temperatures around 26 °C and relative humidity around 70-75%.

Results

Production 
The Production division had the largest match participation with 341 shooters (25.4%). It was won by the frenchman Eric Grauffel who thereby took his eighth world championship title in the overall category. Reigning Production world champion Ben Stoeger did not compete in the championship.

Individual

Open 
The Open division had the second largest match participation with 333 competitors (24.8%).

Individual

Standard 

The Standard division had the third largest match participation with 234 competitors (17.4%).

Individual

Production Optics 
The Production Optics division had the fourth largest match participation with 207 competitors (15.4%).

Individual

Classic 
The Classic division had the fifth largest match participation with 126 competitors (9.4%).

Individual

Production Optics Light 
The Production Optics Light division had the second smallest match participation with 58 competitors (4.3%).

Individual

Revolver 
The Revolver division had the smallest match participation with 46 competitors (3.4%).

Individual

See also 
IPSC Rifle World Shoots
IPSC Shotgun World Shoots
IPSC Action Air World Shoot

References

External links 
 2022 Handgun World Shoot Stagebriefs per 2022-10-24
 Official Match Results | 2022 IPSC Handgun World Shoot

2022
IPSC
Shooting competitions in Thailand
International sports competitions hosted by Thailand